Khronos is the second album released by Maktub.  It was recorded and mixed in only two weeks with producer Steve Fisk.  Originally released on Ossia Records, after a year of good initial sales, New York City label Velour signed Maktub and the album was re-released on April 8, 2003 minus one track (track 10: "Motherfucker").

Track listing
"You Can't Hide"  – 3:31
"So Tired"  – 3:20
"Give Me Some Time"  – 3:23
"Baby Can't Wait"  – 3:55
"We've Got Desire"  – 3:41
"Just Like Murder"  – 4:32
"See Clearly"  – 5:47
"Say You Will"  – 4:14
"No Quarter"  – 8:04
"Then We'll Know"  – 7:00

References 

Maktub albums
2003 albums
Velour Recordings albums